Leandro Hercílio Carvalho da Silveira (born September 30, 1983 in Rio de Janeiro), or simply Leandro Carvalho, is a footballer who plays as adefensive midfielder. He currently plays for Madureira.

External links

1983 births
Living people
Association football midfielders
Campeonato Brasileiro Série A players
Campeonato Brasileiro Série B players
Campeonato Brasileiro Série D players
Footballers from Rio de Janeiro (city)
Brazilian footballers
Botafogo de Futebol e Regatas players
Sertãozinho Futebol Clube players
Sport Club do Recife players
Figueirense FC players
Itumbiara Esporte Clube players
Atlético Clube Goianiense players
Botafogo Futebol Clube (SP) players
Guarani FC players
Joinville Esporte Clube players
Associação Desportiva São Caetano players
Mirassol Futebol Clube players
Madureira Esporte Clube players